Disney Channel Games are a Battle of the Network Stars-based annual television series that aired on the Disney Channel during the summer from 2006 to 2008. Phill Lewis was the co-host of the first two editions in 2006 and 2007, and Brian Stepanek hosted all three editions, with various stars from Disney Channel television series competing for charity as team-based contestants. The Games were filmed at Disney's Wide World of Sports in Orlando.

Disney Channel Games were not aired after 2008, but a similar series called Disney's Friends for Change Games aired in 2011.

Series overview

The Disney Channel Games began as a series of shorts that aired during summer 2006. A second edition followed in summer 2007, with the final edition of the series airing in summer 2008.

A Disney spokesperson confirmed in February 2009 that the Disney Channel Games would not be held that year due to actor availability and Disney's "focusing on the launch of a new pro-social initiative with Disney Channel and Disney XD stars". The result was Disney's Friends for Change initiative. The series also did not air in 2010.

Disney's Friends for Change Games

Disney's Friends for Change Games aired on the Disney Channel as part of Disney's Friends for Change initiative. It replaced the Disney Channel Games. The series was hosted by Jason Earles and Tiffany Thornton, and again featured various Disney Channel stars as team-based contestants competing for their chosen charity. Disney's Friends for Change Games premiered on June 24, 2011, and aired five episodes through July 31, 2011, plus a recap special.

The first event was viewed by between 3.4 million and 4.9 million viewers. The finale special was viewed by 3.6 million viewers, with Kids 6–11 (1.9 million/7.7 rating) and Tweens 9–14 (1.6 million/6.4 rating) making up a sizable portion of the total. The entire series was viewed by over 37 million unique viewers.

References

External links
 
 
 
 

2000s American children's game shows
2006 American television series debuts
2008 American television series endings
2010s American children's game shows
2011 American television series debuts
2011 American television series endings
American annual television specials
Disney Channel
English-language television shows
Television shows set in Orlando, Florida
Television shows filmed in Florida